Jane Harris (born 1961) is a British writer of fiction and screenplays. Her novels have been published in over 20 territories worldwide and translated into many different languages (see The Observations and Gillespie and I). Her most recent work is the novel Sugar Money which has been shortlisted for several literary prizes.

Harris was nominated for the British Book Awards Newcomer of the Year (2007) and the Southbank Show/Times Breakthrough Award (2007), and was chosen as a Waterstones Author of the Future, also in 2007.

Early life and career 
Harris was born in Belfast, Northern Ireland, and spent her early childhood there before her parents moved in 1965 to Glasgow, Scotland. Upon leaving school, she studied English Literature and Drama at the University of Glasgow, then trained as an actress at the East 15 Acting School in London.

After a few years of trying different careers, she worked various jobs abroad such as a dishwasher, a waitress, a chambermaid and an English language teacher. During this period, she began writing short stories while confined to her bed in Portugal with a bout of flu.

On her return to Glasgow, several of her short stories were published in anthologies. In the early 1990s, she was a regular panelist on STV's Scottish Books program.

She went on to obtain a Master's in Creative Writing at the University of East Anglia under Malcolm Bradbury. After gaining a distinction in her degree, she completed a PhD at the same university.

After UEA, she completed a two-year stint as the Arts Council of Great Britain Writer-in-Residence at HM Prison Durham (1992–4). Following this, Harris worked as both a script and novel reader, and a script editor for film companies and The Literary Consultancy. She also taught creative writing for many years, principally at the University of East Anglia.

Harris lives on the south coast of England.

Themes in writing 
The Observations was acclaimed for the playful and compelling voice of its narrator, Bessy Buckley, and for its humorous treatment of dark themes.

Reviews of her second novel, Gillespie and I, have remarked upon its themes of obsession and loneliness.

Sugar Money, her third novel, deals with themes of slavery and freedom, innocence and experience, love and despair.

Harris's work is also notable for dealing with characters on the edge of society. Other common issues in her work centre on family, immigration, exile, national identity, (particularly Scottish and Irish), crime, prostitution, madness, poverty, sexuality, gender roles and hypocrisy.

Novels

The Observations (2006) 

Harris's best-selling debut was shortlisted for the Orange Prize for Fiction 2007. It was Waterstones book of the month and Faber & Faber's lead debut fiction title for spring 2006 (with its biggest ever initial print run for a first book).

The Observations was well-received with widespread favorable reviews appearing online (e.g. in Kirkus Reviews) and in publications such as The Guardian, The Independent, The Times, The TLS and The London Review of Books.

The novel is narrated by Bessy Buckley who flees a murky past in Glasgow and takes a job at the age of 15 as a maid to Arabella who makes strange demands of her including asking her to write a journal.

Gillespie and I (2011) 

Harris's second novel, Gillespie and I, was also well-received with excellent reviews online (e.g. in Kirkus Reviews) and in the press, including The Sunday Times, The Guardian, The TLS, The Daily Mail, The Independent and Scotland on Sunday. It is a chilling tale, largely set in the late 19th century, and involving anonymous letters, sleazy journalism and a notorious court case.

Sugar Money (2017) 
Harris's third novel, Sugar Money, was published in October 2017, again to critical acclaim with widespread positive reviews online and in many publications including The Times, The Sunday Times, The Independent, The Express, The Irish Times, The Glasgow Herald, The Spectator and The Daily Mail.

Sugar Money has been shortlisted for a number of prizes including The Walter Scott Prize, The Wilbur Smith Prize for Adventure Writing and the Historical Writers Association Gold Crown Prize.

Martinique, 1765, and brothers Emile and Lucien are charged by their French master, Father Cleophas, with a mission. They must return to Grenada, the island they once called home, and smuggle back the 42 slaves claimed by English invaders at the hospital plantation in Fort Royal. While Lucien, barely in his teens, sees the trip as a great adventure, the older and worldlier Emile has no illusions about the dangers they will face. But with no choice other than to obey Cleophas - and sensing the possibility, however remote, of finding his first love Celeste - he sets out with his brother on this 'reckless venture'.

'Pitches you headfirst into this outstanding, heartbreaking story of siblings, slavery and the savagery of the colonial past.' Sunday Express

'Harris builds a lush sense of place, and the pace and tension of a rip-roaring adventure here, with derring-do and double-crossing.' Siobhan Murphy, The Times

'Through masterful detail, Harris shows the dehumanisation of the brothers and their fellow slaves . . . Beautifully cadenced.' Irish Times

Awards and Shortlistings

Sugar Money 
 Shortlisted for The Wilbur Smith Prize for Adventure Writing(2018)
Shortlisted for the Walter Scott Prize (2018)
Shortlisted for the Historical Writers Association Gold Crown Prize (2018)

Gillespie And I 
Shortlisted for Popular Fiction Book of the Year in Galaxy National Book Awards UK (2011)
Longlisted for the Orange Prize for Fiction (now the Womens Prize For Fiction) (2012)
The Independent newspaper voted it one of the 50 best reads for the summer (2011)

The Observations 
 Selected as one of Richard and Judy's 100 Best Books of the Decade in 2011.
 Shortlisted for a French Prix du Premier Roman Etranger award in 2009
 Shortlisted for the Orange Prize for Fiction (2007)<ref>Wikipedia Retrieved 2019-11-05
 Won the USA Book of the Month Club First Fiction Prize (2007)
 Waterstones' Book of the Month (April 2006)
 Shortlisted for Saltire Society Literary Awards First Book of the Year 2006

Short stories 

Her short stories have received a number of prizes including the Penguin/Observer Newspaper Short Story Award, 1993. She was awarded an Arts Council writer's grant in 2000.

Harris has been published in a wide variety of anthologies and literary magazines including New Writing 3, edited by Andrew Motion and Candice Rodd, and in several volumes of New Writing Scotland.

Ascension was commissioned for BBC Radio 3's The Verb. Jane read the story when it was broadcast live from the Radio Theatre at Broadcasting House on 6 May 2011.

Screenplays 

Harris has written a number of award-winning short films, culminating in 2000 when Bait (funded by Film4 Productions) was BAFTA-nominated. The film won the Kodak Award and Best Short at the Newport Film Festival in the US.

In 2001, Going Down (funded by Working Title Films) was also nominated for a BAFTA and won prizes for Best Drama at the BBC Short Film Festival, Best Short at the Angers Film Festival and was runner-up in the Turner Classic Movie Awards.

Harris was shortlisted in 1999 and 2000 for the BBC's Dennis Potter Awards.

Radio 

 Ascension 1979, a specially commissioned short story, was read by Harris live on BBC Radio 3's The Verb in May 2011.
 Jane Harris talks to Jane Garvey on BBC Radio 4's Woman's Hour in May 2011.
 The Observations was adapted by Chris Dolan and dramatised on BBC Radio 4 Woman's Hour in April 2007.
 Gillespie and I was adapted by Chris Dolan and dramatized on BBC Radio 4 in October 2013.

References

External links
 Official Website
 Once Upon A Life – The Observer magazine''
 Review by Sarah Gilmartin of Sugar Money in Irish Times
 Jean Zimmerman reviews Sugar Money for New York Times
 Sugar Money review in The Express
 Jane Harris profile for Walter Scott Prize shortlist 2018
The view from here literary magazine: Interview with Jane Harris

1961 births
Living people
Alumni of the University of Glasgow
Alumni of the University of East Anglia
Academics of the University of East Anglia
21st-century British novelists
Scottish novelists
Writers from Glasgow
21st-century British women writers
Writers from Belfast